Kreetta Onkeli (born 1970, Jyväskylä, Finland) is a Finnish writer. Her breakthrough novel "Ilonen talo" (a happy house) was published in 1996, and it received the Kalevi Jäntti award. After that she did not publish any books for seven years. Then she published short stories, columns and three more novels, and after 2013 she has published two books for children. One of them was awarded with Finlandia Junior Award.

Before publication of the first novel she was studying dramaturgy in at the Helsinki Theatre Academy, but dropped out to become a freelance writer.  In 2016 she enrolled in the nursing school.

The first novel Ilonen talo is partly autobiographical, and tells about the writer's mother who was an alcoholist.

References 

1970 births
Finnish women children's writers
Living people